The Ford Fusion Hybrid is a gasoline-electric hybrid powered version of the mid-sized Ford Fusion sedan manufactured and marketed by Ford, now in its second generation. A plug-in hybrid version, the Ford Fusion Energi, was released in the U.S. in February 2013.

The first generation was launched to the U.S. market in March 2009 for model year 2010, together with its badge-engineered variants, the Mercury Milan Hybrid and the Lincoln MKZ Hybrid. The second generation was launched under the Ford and Lincoln brands for model year 2013, went on sale in the U.S. in October 2012.

The U.S. Environmental Protection Agency (EPA) rated the 2010 Ford Fusion Hybrid at  combined city/highway. The EPA rated the Energi's combined city/highway fuel economy in all-electric mode at 88 miles per gallon gasoline equivalent (MPG-e) (2.7 L gasoline equivalent/100 km; 106 mpg-imp).

The Fusion Hybrid has won the 2010 North American Car of the Year Award, and the entire 2013 Ford Fusion line-up, including the Fusion hybrid and plug-in variants, won the 2013 Green Car of the Year.  , over 285,000 units of the Fusion hybrid family have been sold in the United States since 2009, including the plug-in hybrid variant. , sales of the Fusion Energi totaled 43,327 units delivered in its main market, the U.S.

First generation

History and development

The hybrid electric version of the Fusion was announced at the 2005 North American International Auto Show, along with the public introduction of the original 2006 Fusion. At that time Ford announced that the hybrid version was scheduled to be introduced in early 2009 for the 2010 model year, for a suggested retail price of US$27,270. The new Fusion Hybrid and Fusion Sport officially debuted at the Greater Los Angeles Auto Show in November 2008.

The Fusion Hybrid is manufactured at Ford's Hermosillo Stamping & Assembly plant, located in Sonora, Mexico. Ford set a modest sales target of about 25,000 vehicles a year for the Fusion Hybrid and the similar Mercury Milan.

The Fusion Hybrid was made available for press testing in December 2008 and launched to the U.S. market in March 2009. During the same month two other new hybrid models also came on sale, the Honda Insight and the Mercury Milan. During the few days that were available to the public, Ford's new Fusion and Milan hybrids sold a combined 451 units, representing 3.0% of all Fusion and Milan models sold in March 2009.

The Fusion is the first new hybrid vehicle the Ford brand offered in five years, and is the second hybrid vehicle after the Ford Escape Hybrid. The Ford Fusion and Mercury Milan hybrids join the Saturn Vue Green Line Hybrid for Mexican-built hybrid vehicles.

The MKZ Hybrid offers several improvements of Ford's Smart Gauge with EcoGuide, first introduced in the 2010 Fusion Hybrid.

Design and technology

The Fusion Hybrid is a "full" hybrid because both propulsion sources, an electric motor powered by a Sanyo supplied 275 V nickel-metal hydride battery, and a 2.5L Atkinson cycle I4 156 hp 136 ft.lbs. gasoline engine with intake variable cam timing(iVCT), have substantial power ratings and either can be used alone to propel the vehicle. When braking or decelerating, the Fusion's hybrid system uses regenerative braking, where the electric drive motor becomes a generator, converting the vehicle's momentum back to electricity for storage in the batteries. Ford claims that nearly 94 percent energy recovery is achieved by first delivering full regenerative braking followed by friction brakes during city driving.

Once perceived as a laggard in hybrid technology, Ford now claims nearly 500 hybrid patents that allow the Fusion Hybrid to achieve 41 MPG on the highway. According to Hybridcars.com, Ford has pointed to its talented inventors, making "special mention of Ming Kuang who has helped Ford since 2000 to expand its portfolio of hybrid patents from just 10 patents when he began to 461 today." Quoted in Autotrader.com, the veteran engineer says "it's about helping make the world my children live in-and the world my children's children will live in-a better place."

Safety
The Ford Fusion line-up was included in the Insurance Institute for Highway Safety 2010 "Top Safety Pick's" rating for the mid-size category. As of June 2010, Ford Fusion and Mercury Milan hybrids are the only two mid-size hybrid vehicles in the list. Due to the fact that Ford recently modified and strengthened the roof structure of the Flex, Fusion, and MKT vehicles, these 2010 ratings apply only to Lincoln MKZs, Mercury Milan and Fusions built after April 2010.

Fuel economy and environmental performance

The U.S. Environmental Protection Agency (EPA) has rated the fuel economy for the 2010 Fusion Hybrid at  city,  highway.  The following table compares fuel economy, carbon footprint, and petroleum consumption between the hybrid version and other drivetrains of the Fusion family as estimated by the EPA and the U.S. Department of Energy:

Over another  of testing against a Toyota Camry Hybrid, the same car only achieved , while the Camry Hybrid delivered . "If our early numbers hold up, the Fusion Hybrid would be a rare instance of the EPA relapsing into the world of mileage make-believe." However, they noted that when driven very conservatively, the EPA numbers could be achieved. "In typical driving, you might as well throw the Fusion's EPA numbers out the window. But if you decide to really work at it, they're possible."

According to Ford, the vehicle was built to have a fuel efficiency of 41 mpg in the city and 36 mpg on the highway by EPA standards.  In December 2008, Autoblog Green staff reported they had obtained in-city mileage of 43.1 mpg on the streets of Los Angeles. In addition, a Los Angeles Times reporter informed in December 2008 that he had obtained 52 mpg in mixed city-highway driving with little difficulty.

On a single-tank publicity stunt conducted in April 2009, a Fusion Hybrid managed  on a 1,445.7 mile trip.

Edmunds' InsideLine received a 2010 Fusion Hybrid as a long-term test car.

Reduced Electric Vehicle Operation Of 2010 - 2012 Fusion Hybrid

Many owners complained to Ford about greatly reduced gas mileage after 9 years of operation because of reduced electric vehicle operation and increased gasoline engine operation.  Ford notified their dealers that they are investigating a fix:

TSB #SSM 48238 "Oct 3 2019  8922 - 2010-2012 Fusion HEV, 2010-2011 Milan HEV, 2011-2012 MKZ HEV - Reduced ElectricVehicle Operation

Some 2010-2012 Fusion hybrid electric vehicle (HEV), 2010-2011 Milan HEV and 2011-2012 MKZ HEV vehicles may experience reduced electric vehicle operation and increased gasoline engine operation. Do not attempt repairs at this time. Engineering is investigating, monitor OASIS for updates."

Customer satisfaction program number is 22G04 was issued by Ford in September 2022.  Ford will perform the BECM/PCM update free of charge through Sept 30, 2023.  Owners are eligible for a refund if you paid to have this performed at a dealer previously, and can provide documentation. Title: Application Performance Upgrade  22G04 Certain 2010 – 2012 Model Year Fusion / MKZ / Milan Hybrid Vehicles Hybrid Battery Reduced Electric Vehicle Operation BECM and PCM Software Update

Payback time
According to Edmunds.com, the price premium paid for the Fusion Hybrid takes 5 years to recover in fuel savings as compared to its non-hybrid sibling, and is one of the quickest payback periods among top selling hybrids as of February 2012. These estimates assume an average of  annual driving and vehicle prices correspond to Edmunds.com's true market value estimates. The Lincoln MKZ Hybrid has no price premium.

SmartGauge for eco driving

The Fusion Hybrid comes with a SmartGauge with EcoGuide which features two 4.3-inch high-resolution, full-color LCD screens on either side of the vehicle's analog speedometer. The objective of these panel display is to coach drivers on how to optimize the performance of their hybrid by keeping track of their eco driving improvements.

These screens can be configured to show different levels of driver information, including fuel and battery power levels, and average and instant fuel economy. When set in tutorial mode, the instrument panel in the right side "grows" leaves and vines on-screen to reward fuel-efficient driving. The more leaves and vines that appear, the more efficient the driving behavior is and the more fuel is being saved. Long-term fuel efficiency can also be displayed as a traditional chart. The left side display shows when the car is in pure-electric mode, and shows the state of battery charge.

The 2011 Lincoln MKZ Hybrid, launched in September 2010, offers an improvement of Ford's SmartGauge with EcoGuide introduced with the 2010 Fusion and Milan hybrids.

In 2012, with the introduction of the second generation Fusion, Ford redesigned its SmartGauge with EcoGuide system giving it a newer look and new customizable MyView features. One of the new features, Brake Coach, gives instant feedback on the driver's braking habits and gives them advice to maximize the efficiency of the regenerative braking system.

Tax credit
The Fusion Hybrid qualified for a maximum hybrid tax credit of US$3,400 if purchased by March 31, 2009. The credit dropped to US$1,700 if purchased by September 30, 2009, to US$850 if purchased from October 2009 and March 31, 2010, and phased out on April 1, 2010.

Other markets
The Brazilian version of the Fusion Hybrid was unveiled at the 2010 São Paulo International Auto Show. The Fusion Hybrid was the first full hybrid car sold in Brazil. Imported from Mexico, the Fusion Hybrid engine performance and fuel system durability was tested with the Brazilian mandatory E20 to E25 ethanol blends.

Second generation

A complete redesign of the Ford Fusion lineup for the model year 2013 was unveiled at the 2012 North American International Auto Show. The new lineup includes three optional engines for the conventional four-cylinder-only gasoline model, a next-generation hybrid version, and a plug-in hybrid version, the Ford Fusion Energi. The Ford Fusion became the first production sedan to offer these three powertrain options. The expected fuel economy was a combined . Sales of the gasoline-powered and hybrid version began in the U.S. in October 2012.

Sales in Europe and Asia, under the Ford Mondeo name, were planned to start in 2013. Ford began taking orders of the Mondeo Hybrid in Germany in August 2014. Production of the Mondeo Hybrid began at Ford's Valencia, Spain, plant in November 2014.

The nickel-metal hydride batteries used in the hybrid first generation were replaced with lithium-ion batteries. Initially, the second generation Fusion Hybrid was rated  with the same rating for combined/city/highway cycles. However, in June 2014 Ford announced that it was downgrading the EPA fuel economy ratings on six of its 2013 and 2014 model year vehicles, including all its C-Max, Fusion and MKZ full hybrids and its two plug-in Energi models. The ratings were lowered after an error was discovered in the company's internal testing data. Ford is making a goodwill payments to around 200,000 customers affected by its mistake. After the ratings were lowered the 2013/14 Fusion Hybrid still slightly outperforms the 2012/2014 Toyota Camry Hybrid LE by 1 mpg-US city and 2 mpg-US highway, and the Camry XLE by 4 mpg-US city and 3 mpg-US highway.

The second generation hybrid has a powertrain with a 2.0-liter Atkinson-cycle inline-four – downsized from the 2.5-liter unit used in the first generation Fusion Hybrid.

The 2013 Fusion Hybrid includes driver assistance and technologies based on sensors, cameras and radar that enable the car to see and respond. Fusion can help drivers maintain proper lane position (Lane Keeping System); adjust vehicle speed to changing traffic conditions through adaptive cruise control; active park assist to help identify suitable parking spaces and help park; and Blind Spot Information System (BLIS) with cross-traffic alert, which consists of sensors in both rear quarter-panels that are able to detect traffic in a driver's blind spot, providing both audible and visual warnings if traffic unseen by the driver is detected. BLIS technology enables cross-traffic alert, even aiding drivers backing out of parking space where visibility is obstructed.

Lincoln MKZ Hybrid

During the 2012 North American International Auto Show Ford also unveiled the Lincoln MKZ concept model. Ford offers a hybrid option of the redesigned 2013 Lincoln MKZ, and like the previous MKZ generation, the MKZ Hybrid is available for the same price as the non-hybrid model.

After the ratings of six Ford models were downgraded in June 2014, the MKZ was the model with the largest fuel economy reduction, 7 mpg-US in city/highway combined. Despite sharing the same powertrain, the 2013/14 MKZ Hybrid is rated 4 mpg-US combined less than its sibling the second generation Ford Fusion Hybrid, and 6 mpg-US less in city driving.

Ford Mondeo Hybrid
The Mondeo Hybrid shares the same powertrain of the Fusion Hybrid combining a 2.0-liter gasoline engine with an electric motor and 1.4 kilowatt-hour lithium-ion battery. Ford set a pricing for the Mondeo Hybrid that is competitive with Mondeo diesel powertrain variants.

Controversy over fuel economy ratings

In December 2012, Motor Trend reported that Consumer Reports and Green Car Reports have found that the 2013 Ford C-Max Hybrid and 2013 Ford Fusion Hybrid, which share the same powertrain, do not deliver their triple  EPA ratings in real-world use. Consumer Reports concluded that the overall fuel economy for the Fusion Hybrid is off by 8 mpg, representing a deviation of about 20%. The consumer magazine said that their overall fuel economy results are usually close to the EPA's combined-mpg estimate, and among current models tested, more than 80% fall within 2 mpg margin. The largest discrepancy the magazine has previously found was 7 and 6 mpg for the Toyota Prius c and the Prius liftback/fastback, respectively.

A few days later the Environmental Protection Agency said it will review claims that two new Ford hybrid vehicles are not delivering the advertised 47 mpg. Linc Wehrly, Director of Light-duty Vehicle Center Compliance Division at EPA's National Vehicle and Fuel Emissions Laboratory in Ann Arbor, Michigan commented that hybrids have far more variability in miles per gallon than a conventional vehicle. Most vehicles' real-world gasoline mileage is less than the EPA sticker number, and can often be 20% less than the sticker number depending on speed, temperature and other factors. The EPA explained that with hybrids the gap is much wider, as high as a 30% drop. Ford responded in a statement, saying that, "Early C-MAX Hybrid and Fusion Hybrid customers praise the vehicles and report a range of fuel economy figures, including some reports above 47 mpg. This reinforces the fact that driving styles, driving conditions, and other factors can cause mileage to vary." A Ford spokesman also said they followed EPA's test guidelines and the company is standing by the ratings as determined by the current testing protocols. Nevertheless, they are working closely with the agency to determine if any changes are needed for the industry relative to hybrid vehicle testing.

In July 2013, Ford issued a voluntary software update for the 2013 model year Fusion, C-Max and MKZ Hybrid, that attempts to improve on the lower-than-expected MPG claims.
Some of the changes include:
 Optimizing the use of Active Grille Shutters to reduce aerodynamic drag under more driving and temperature conditions including cold weather, during air conditioner use and when the engine coolant temperature is higher
 Reducing the electric fan speed as a function of coolant temperature to minimize the fan's energy consumption
 Shortening engine warm-up time by up to 50 percent to enable electric-only driving and engine shutdown at stops sooner after cold starts
 Optimizing the climate control system to minimize use of the air conditioning compressor and reduce the energy used in cold weather operation.

In August 2013, and due to the criticism and after several lawsuits about the worse-than-expected fuel economy, Ford voluntarily lowered all three EPA ratings of the C-Max Hybrid and will pay about a rebate to some 32,000 C-Max owners. Ford has no plans to change the fuel economy ratings on the 2013 Fusion hybrid, because the company used the Fusion hybrid test to generate the fuel economy label for the C-Max Hybrid following EPA's rules.

Ford Fusion Energi

The Fusion Energi is a plug-in hybrid unveiled at the 2012 North American International Auto Show, and retail sales in the U.S. began in February 2013. Energi models purchased in or after 2010 are eligible for a $4,007 tax credit, which is based on the capacity of the battery used to fuel the vehicle. The 2013 Fusion Energi is eligible for access to California's high-occupancy vehicle lanes (HOV) with a solo driver, and also for a  California state tax rebate.

A refreshed 2017 Fusion Energi was released by mid-2016. In addition to a new fascia and other technological upgrades, the 2017 model year has more efficient electric motors, allowing the refreshed 2017 model year Fusion Energi to increase its all-electric range and to improve its EPA fuel economy ratings. , over 43,700 units have been sold in North America, with 43,327 units delivered in the U.S. and about 386 units in Canada.

Unlike the regular hybrid there is no Lincoln MKZ version of the Energi.

Specifications and range
The Fusion Energi uses the same non-turbo 2-liter 4-cylinder engine supplements as the 2013 Fusion Hybrid to assist the electric motor. The Energi has a  7.6 kWh lithium-ion battery that powers the  electric motor.

The EPA's 2015 edition of the Light-Duty Automotive Technology, Carbon Dioxide Emissions, and Fuel Economy Trends presents utility factors for plug-in hybrids to represent the percentage of miles that will be driven using electricity by an average driver, in electric only or blended modes. Both the Fusion and C-Max Energi models have a utility factor in EV mode of 45%, compared with 83% for the BMW i3 REx, 66/65% for the Chevrolet Volt/Cadillac ELR, 43% for the McLaren P1, 37% for the BMW i8, and 29% for the Toyota Prius PHV.

In May 2016, Ford reported, based on data collected from more than 610 million miles (976 million km) logged by its electrified vehicles through its telematics system, that drivers of these vehicles run an average of  annually on their vehicles, with about half of those miles operating in all-electric mode. Ford notes that with the enhanced electric range of the 2017 model year model, the average Fusion Energi commuter could go the entire day using no gasoline, if the car is fully charged both before leaving for work and before leaving for home. According to Ford data, currently most customers are likely charging their vehicles only at home.

Fuel economy
Initially, the EPA rated the Energi's combined city/highway fuel economy in all-electric mode at 100 miles per gallon gasoline equivalent (MPG-e) (2.4 L gasoline equivalent/100 km). Later, due to complaints from owners not achieving the sticker fuel economy, and following a technical review, the official EPA rating in EV mode was downgraded to 88 MPG-e. The Fusion Energi combined fuel economy equivalent is the same as the 2013 Ford C-Max Energi. EPA's rating for combined EV/hybrid operation is 51 MPG-e (4.6 L gasoline equivalent/100 km), which allowed the Fusion Energi to rank at the time in sixth place, together with the C-Max Energi, among the top ten EPA-Rated Fuel Sippers since 1984.

The refreshed 2017 model year Fusion Energi has an increased EPA rated fuel economy in all-electric mode to 97 miles per gallon gasoline equivalent (MPG-e) for combined city/highway driving, with an energy consumption of 35 kWh/100 mi.

A police pursuit version achieves , whereas the regular Interceptor gets .

Awards and recognitions

First generation
 In April 2009, Kelley Blue Book included the 2010 Ford Fusion Hybrid among its 2009 list of "Top 10 Green Cars".
 The 2009 U.S. News & World Report car ranking for best affordable mid-size cars is led by the 2010 Mercury Milan Hybrid followed by the 2010 Ford Fusion Hybrid. The 2010 Toyota Prius is ranked No. 4 together with the 2010 Toyota Camry Hybrid, and the 2009 Nissan Altima Hybrid ranks No. 12.
 In November 2009, the entire 2010 Ford Fusion line-up, including the Fusion Hybrid, was selected as the 2010 Motor Trend Car of the Year.

 In December 2009, Car and Driver magazine listed the 2010 Fusion Hybrid among the "10 Best Cars". The magazine stated that the Fusion Hybrid was the most advanced of all the cars they tested.
 In December 2009, Automobile Magazine named the Fusion Hybrid one of the 2010 Automobile All-Stars.
 In January 2010, the Fusion Hybrid won the 2010 North American Car of the Year Award at the Detroit Auto Show.
In February 2010, Consumer Reports included the Fusion Hybrid in the "American Top Picks 2010" leading the Green Car category.
 In April 2010, Kelley Blue Book again included the Ford Fusion Hybrid among its 2010 list of "Top 10 Green Cars".
 In March 2010, Mother Earth News included the 2010 Fusion Hybrid in its list of "Best Green Cars of 2010".
In February 2011, Consumer Reports included the Fusion Hybrid in the "American Top Picks 2011" leading the Green Car category.

Second generation
In November 2012, the entire 2013 Ford Fusion line-up, including the Fusion hybrid and plug-in variants, and the gasoline and EcoBoost engine options, won the 2013 Green Car of the Year awarded by the Green Car Journal at the Los Angeles Auto Show.

Sales

2009–2012
During 2009, the Fusion Hybrid sold in the U.S. market a total of 15,554 units and the Milan Hybrid 1,486 units, as reported by the manufacturers. Although the Fusion Hybrid helped Ford bypass Honda to become the second biggest seller of hybrids in the US market in the month of December 2009, for the whole year of 2009, Honda sold more hybrid vehicles (35,691 units) than Ford (33,520 units) and the 2010 Honda Insight also outsold the Fusion Hybrid, with 20,572 units.

For 2010, U.S. sales of Ford Fusion Hybrid reached of 20,816 units, helping the model to become the third best selling hybrid in 2010 after the Toyota Prius and Honda Insight. The Milan Hybrid sold 1,416 units in 2010 and its production was discontinued as part of Ford's decision to phase out the entire Mercury brand. Purchases by the US Government at the behest of the Obama administration accounted for almost a third of the Ford Fusion Hybrids produced between 2009 and late 2010.

Ford reported that Fusion sales reached 151,004 units through July 2011, of which, 7,780 were the hybrid version, representing a 5.1% market share of all Fusion sales. During year 2011, the Fusion Hybrid sold 11,286 units and the Lincoln MKZ Hybrid sold 5,739 units, ranking sixth and tenth correspondingly, in hybrid sales for calendar year 2011. Fusion hybrid sales in 2012 increased 24.9% over 2011 sales, and hybrid models represented a 5.8% share of the 241,263 Fusion sold in 2012.

2013

The introduction of the redesigned 2013 model year Fusion, with a more fuel efficient second generation powertrain, resulted in increased sales of the hybrid version, and by August 2013, sales were up 275.2% over the same period in 2012. The Fusion Energi achieved record sales in August 2013. Also during this month, the Fusion Hybrid recorded its best sales month ever in Washington, D.C., San Francisco and Seattle, and its second best-selling month in Los Angeles, another key hybrid market. This rapid increase in sales contributed to Ford achieving its best August electric drive vehicle sales ever. The Fusion Hybrid sales increased 164.3% from 2012 and ended 2013 as the fourth top selling hybrid in the U.S. after the Prius liftback, the Prius c and the Toyota Camry Hybrid.

The redesigned 2013 model year Lincoln MKZ hybrid also experienced somewhat stronger sales during 2013. In July 2013, Ford announced that for the 2014 model year MKZ hybrid it would increase the share of production allocated to the hybrid version, from 20% for the 2013 model year to 40% of the 2014 model year. The Lincoln MKZ Hybrid is popular among consumers in part because it has the same base price as the non-hybrid MKZ.

2014

Sales of hybrid electric cars in the U.S. in 2014 declined 8.8% from 2013. Following the trend of the hybrid market, Fusion Hybrid sales were down 5.0% from 2013, and continued to rank as the fourth top selling hybrid in the U.S. Sales of Lincoln MKZ Hybrid continued its growth trend with sales up 34.3% from a year earlier. The American plug-in hybrid market in 2014 was up 13.1% from 2013, while combined sales of both of Ford's Energi models (Fusion and C-Max) increased by 50.9% despite the reduction of their fuel economy ratings. Sales of the Fusion Energi were up 89.7% from 2013 while C-Mx Energi sales were up only by 17.9%.

2015

The American hybrid electric segment continued to decline in 2015, down 15% from 2014. Following the general U.S. trend, Fusion Hybrid sales were down 30.3% from 2014, and the Fusion continued to rank as the fourth top selling hybrid in the U.S. Sales of Lincoln MKZ Hybrid fell 16.2% from a year earlier. The American plug-in hybrid market in 2015 was up 5.8% from 2014, however, sales of the Fusion Energi were down 15.6% from 2014, and C-Max Energi sales were down by 10.0%. The Fusion Energi ranked as the second top selling plug-in hybrid in the country after the Chevrolet Volt, up from third place in 2014, and passing the Toyota Prius Plug-in Hybrid.

2017

In 2017, after a redesign which improved efficiency, Ford Fusion Hybrid sales surged by 70.8%, making it the number two selling hybrid car in America, after the Toyota Prius Liftback, which had 12.5% more sales. In contrast, the newly released Prius Prime surged 745%, consuming all the growth in the PHEV market, and American PHEVs like the Fusion (-39.6%) and Chevy Volt (-17.7%) suffered steep declines as new PHEV models from Volvo, BMW, and Mercedes ate into American car sales.

Total US sales

Since 2009 a total of 356,534 units of the Fusion hybrid family, including the Energi plug-in hybrid, have been sold in the United States through December 2017. U.S. sales by year for each model and the share of hybrids out of total model sales are shown in the following table:

See also

 Ford CD2 platform
 Ford CD4 platform
 Ford Fusion (regular non-hybrid version)
 Ford Motor Company
 Hybrid electric vehicles in the United States
 List of hybrid vehicles
 List of modern production plug-in electric vehicles
 Plug-in electric vehicles in the United States

References

External links
 Ford's Fusion Hybrid page (Click on Green)
 Fusion Hybrid timetable on tax credits

Fusion Hybrid
Front-wheel-drive vehicles
Mid-size cars
Hybrid electric cars
Plug-in hybrid vehicles
Sedans
Police vehicles
Partial zero-emissions vehicles
Cars introduced in 2009
Cars introduced in 2013
Fusion Hybrid
Vehicles with CVT transmission